Los Violines de Lima were a popular Peruvian conjunto of the 1960s and 70s. The band released 11 albums on Virrey Records from 1962 to 1976, while also appearing with Luis Alberto del Parana and his band Los Paraguayos for Philips in 1966 and on two Orion Records LPs in 1968.

Discography
Los Violines De Lima 1962
Los Violines De Lima, Vol. 2 1963
Limeña 1964
Una Noche en el Sky Room 1965
Luis Alberto del Parana y Los Paraguayos con Los Violines De Lima (Philips) 1966
Puno Ciudad Del Lago 1968
Audición de Gala del Pasillo Ecuatoriano (Orion Records) 1968
La Bocina (Orion LP-12.25119) 1968
Regresa 1970
Vírgenes del Sol 1971
El Cóndor Pasa 1971
Mi Viaje Por América 1972
India Bella 1972
Sincera Confesión 1976

References

Peruvian musical groups